Cortex is a scientific journal published semimonthly by Elsevier. It is devoted to the study of "cognition and of the relationship between the nervous system and mental processes". The journal was founded in 1964 and is currently edited by Sergio Della Sala. Currently, S. Della Sala and J. Grafman are editors of the journal.

External links
 Cortex Online

Neuroscience journals
Cognitive science journals
Publications established in 1964
English-language journals
Elsevier academic journals
Neuropsychology journals